Light Blade (Lahav Or) is a laser weapon system to intercept airborne incendiary devices: incendiary balloons, incendiary kites, and drones. These were used in significant numbers in a Palestinian arson campaign launched in April 2018 from the Gaza Strip. It was initially unveiled in 2019 and deployed to the Gaza border in 2020. The initial deployment reported 90% efficiency.

See also
Iron Beam

References

Emergency management in Israel
Military lasers
Israeli inventions
Weapons and ammunition introduced in 2019